Gordon Ernest Medd (17 August 1925 – January 1996) was an English professional footballer who played as a winger in the Football League for Walsall, Rochdale and York City, in non-League football for Worcester City and Sutton Coldfield Town, and was on the books of Birmingham City without making a league appearance.

References

1925 births
Footballers from Birmingham, West Midlands
1996 deaths
English footballers
Association football forwards
Worcester City F.C. players
Birmingham City F.C. players
Walsall F.C. players
Rochdale A.F.C. players
York City F.C. players
Sutton Coldfield Town F.C. players
English Football League players